Fried Green Tomatoes is a 1991 American comedy-drama film directed by Jon Avnet and based on Fannie Flagg's 1987 novel Fried Green Tomatoes at the Whistle Stop Cafe. Written by Flagg and Carol Sobieski, and starring Kathy Bates, Jessica Tandy, Mary Stuart Masterson, Mary-Louise Parker and Cicely Tyson, the film tells the story of a housewife who, unhappy with her life, befriends an elderly lady in a nursing home and is enthralled by the tales she tells of people she used to know.

The film was released in theaters in the United States on December 27, 1991, garnered positive reviews from critics and was a box office hit, grossing $119.4 million on a $11 million budget. It was nominated for two Oscars at the 64th Academy Awards: Best Supporting Actress (Tandy) and Best Adapted Screenplay.

Plot

Evelyn Couch, a timid housewife in her 40s, meets elderly Ninny Threadgoode at an Alabama nursing home. Evelyn's husband, Ed, has an aunt living there. Over several encounters, Ninny tells Evelyn about the long-abandoned town of Whistle Stop and its residents. The film's subplot concerns Evelyn's dissatisfaction with her marriage, her life, her growing confidence, and a developing friendship with Ninny. The narrative switches several times between Ninny's story set between World War I and World War II, and Evelyn's life in 1980s Birmingham.

Ninny's tale begins with tomboy Idgie Threadgoode, the youngest member of her family, who would later become Ninny's sister-in-law. Young Idgie is devastated when her beloved older brother, Buddy, is killed by a train. She remains socially withdrawn well into her adolescence. At the Threadgoode family's request, Buddy's former girlfriend, the straitlaced Ruth Jamison, intervenes.

Idgie initially rebuffs Ruth's attempt at friendship, but over the summer they gradually develop a deep attachment and fall in love. Ruth eventually moves to Valdosta, Georgia, to marry Frank Bennett, as she is obligated to do so. When Idgie visits, she discovers that Frank habitually abuses a pregnant Ruth. Against Frank's violent attempts to stop her, Idgie and several men rescue Ruth who returns to Whistle Stop with Idgie, where her baby, Buddy Jr., is born. Papa Threadgoode gives Idgie money to start a business and help care for Ruth and Buddy Jr. She and Ruth open the Whistle Stop Cafe, employing the family cook, Sipsey, and her son, Big George, whose excellent barbecue becomes popular with customers.

Frank returns to Whistle Stop to kidnap his infant son, but an unseen assailant thwarts his attempt; Frank is soon reported missing. About five years later, Frank's truck surfaces in a nearby river. Idgie becomes a suspect, having publicly threatened Frank for beating Ruth. Sheriff Grady Kilgore detains both Idgie and Big George. Kilgore offers to release Idgie and pin Frank's supposed murder solely on Big George, but Idgie refuses. During the subsequent trial, Reverend Scroggins provides false testimony that supports both Idgie's and Big George's alibis. Taking into account Frank's reputation for drunkenness and his body never being found, the judge rules his probable death as accidental and drops all charges against Idgie and Big George.

Shortly after the trial, Ruth is diagnosed with terminal cancer and soon dies. When trains stop running through Whistle Stop, the café closes, and the town folk drift away. Ninny's story concludes, but not before Frank's fate is revealed. When Frank attempted to kidnap Buddy Jr., Sipsey hit Frank over the head with a cast iron skillet, killing him. Frank's truck was pushed into the river, and Idgie convinced Big George to butcher and barbecue Frank's body, which they later served to Sheriff Curtis Smoot, who relentlessly investigated Frank's disappearance. Smoot proclaimed the meal as the best barbecue he ever ate.

Evelyn discovers Ninny was discharged from the nursing home. During her stay there, Ninny's house was condemned and demolished. Evelyn finds Ninny where the house once stood. She wants Ninny to live with her and Ed, to which Ninny agrees. They pass by Ruth's grave which is freshly adorned with a jar containing honey and a honeycomb. A card reads, "I'll always love you, the Bee Charmer". The Bee Charmer was Ruth's nickname for Idgie, and the note reveals that Idgie is still alive.

Cast

Production

Development
Jon Avnet first read the novel in 1987. He was introduced to it by producer Lisa Lindstrom, with whom he worked on television films Heat Wave and Breaking Point. Although he wanted her to give him a synopsis of the story, she insisted he read the book and like her, he loved it. He decided to turn the story into a film and pitched the idea to Norman Lear's company, Act III Communications, who were interested and gave him a small budget for a screenwriter. He hired Carol Sobieski who had written the screenplay for 1982's Annie. She wrote a draft for it as a musical, which he was unhappy with. Sobieski left the project and he hired Flagg, who had been surprised that anyone would want to turn the novel into a film, to develop the script. Although she had some screenwriting experience, she found the process of turning her own novel into a script a strange one. The job was made somewhat easier by the work done by Sobieski and Avnet in choosing which characters from the book were going to be featured, but she found it difficult and also left the project, after writing 70 pages of the screenplay. With no money left to hire another writer, Avnet took the script over himself and spent the next 2–3 years developing it. Flagg gave her blessing to the final draft.

Avnet wrote the film with Jessica Tandy in mind; she expressed excitement about making the film. He had worked with Kathy Bates and Chris O'Donnell on the 1990 film Men Don't Leave before offering them the roles of Evelyn Couch and Buddy Threadgoode respectively. When Bates read the script she loved the characters and was particularly keen to work with Tandy. Mary-Louise Parker was casting director David Rubin's first choice for the role of Ruth Jamison. She read for the part several times, initially unhappy with her own tests. When she read along with Mary Stuart Masterson, theyand the producersagreed that they had good chemistry.

Location and filming
Avnet hired Barbara Ling as production designer. Scouting for a location, she found Juliette, Georgia, a town that was, according to Avnet, nearly deserted. The building chosen to be the Whistle Stop Café was formerly an antique and hardware store. It was redesigned as a cafe, with a horseshoe-shaped counter to allow for optimal camera angles.

The scene where Idgie goes to collect honey from a tree stump for Ruth was originally intended to be performed by a stunt double. However, after the latter backed out at the last minute, Masterson volunteered to do it herself. The footage of her covered in a swarm of live bees is seen in the final version of the film.

Flagg based the Whistle Stop restaurant on the real-life Irondale Café in Irondale, Alabama. She was a frequent visitor and it was formerly owned by her great-aunt.

Differences between the film and novel
Unlike the novel, the film does not make the lesbian romance between the two central characters explicit, instead leaving the relationship between Idgie and Ruth ambiguous. The DVD contains an audio commentary in which the director acknowledges the relationship and points out that a scene between Idgie and Ruth engaging in a food fight was intended to be seen as symbolic love-making.

At the time of the film's debut, it was criticized by reviewers and activists for what was seen as "glossing over" the lesbian relationship. But it won an award from the Gay & Lesbian Alliance Against Defamation for best feature film with lesbian content. The film shows examples of discrimination against African Americans, women, and people living with disabilities, but the examination of sexuality-based prejudice through a robust lesbian plot, as found in the novel, is made more ambiguous.

Although in the book Idgie and Ninny are two distinctly separate characters, at the end of the film it is largely hinted that they are one and the same. This runs counter to Ninny's earlier comment that "I was practically adopted by the Threadgoodes; I married her  brother, Cleo". Additionally, the film has Ruth being in love with Buddy Threadgoode, Idgie's brother.

Release
Fried Green Tomatoes was given a limited release in the United States on December 27, 1991, opening in five theaters. It got a wide release four weeks later on January 24, 1992, in 673 theaters. It ran for 19 weeks in total, with its widest release having been 1,331 theaters.

Critical reception
On review aggregation website Rotten Tomatoes the film holds an approval rating of 75% based on 44 reviews, with an average rating of 6.70/10. The critical consensus reads, "Fried Green Tomatoes tearjerking drama is undeniably manipulative, but in the hands of a skilled cast that includes Jessica Tandy and Kathy Bates, it's also powerfully effective." On Metacritic the film has a weighted average score of 64 out of 100, based on 21 critics, indicating "generally favorable reviews". Audiences polled by CinemaScore gave the film an average grade of "A" on an A+ to F scale.

Critics enjoyed the narrative, but found it conventional and predictable. The adaptation of the separate narrative of book to the screen was criticized by Time Out as "clumsy", Roger Ebert praised the performances, Janet Maslin praised the costume and production design and Emanuel Levy praised the cinematography and score. The cast drew praise for their performances, particularly Masterson and Tandy.

Audience response

After the release of the film, the town of Juliette saw an influx of tourists and, with Jon Avnet's encouragement, locals opened the Whistle Stop Café, recreated to mirror the film set. Although "Whistle Stop Café" is now a registered trademark, other establishments have appeared using that name.

Box office
Fried Green Tomatoes grossed $82.4 million in the United States and Canada, and $37 million in other countries, for a worldwide total of $119.4 million, against a budget of $11 million. In its opening weekend it earned $105,317, and at its wide release opening weekend it earned $5,235,940, which was 6.4 percent of its total gross. According to Box Office Mojo, it ranked at no.11 for all films released in the US in 1991, and no.5 for PG‑13 rated films released that year.

Accolades
Fried Green Tomatoes received two Oscar nominations for Best Supporting Actress and Best Adapted Screenplay. It received two BAFTA nominations, including Best Actress in a Leading Role, and garnered three Golden Globe nominations, including Best Motion Picture – Musical or Comedy. The film was also nominated for the Guldbagge Award for Best Foreign Film.

Home media
The VHS was released by MCA/Universal Home Video in North America on August 20, 1992. The "extended" collector's edition DVD for Region 1 was released by Universal Studios on April 18, 2000. The region free Blu-ray was released March 4, 2014.

In the United Kingdom, the VHS was released as Fried Green Tomatoes at the Whistle Stop Cafe by Columbia Tristar Home Video on October 2, 1992. The DVD for Region 2 was released by Carlton Visual Entertainment on September 9, 2002.

Soundtrack

The Fried Green Tomatoes: Original Motion Picture Soundtrack was supervised by Arthur Baker, who also produced several of the songs. Baker and American singer-songwriter Grayson Hugh co-arranged and recorded Bob Dylan's song "I'll Remember You" for the end-title song. British singer-songwriter Paul Young appears with the song "What Becomes of the Brokenhearted," which peaked at No. 22 on the Billboard Hot 100 in March 1992. The soundtrack featured Patti LaBelle performing Bessie Jackson's 1933 blues song,   "Barbecue Bess".

The original score, composed by Thomas Newman, was released as Fried Green Tomatoes in June 1992.

References

External links

 
 
 Fried Green Tomatoes at The New York Times movie database (archive)
 Fried Green Tomatoes at AFI Catalog of Feature Films, American Film Institute

1991 films
1991 comedy films
1991 drama films
1991 directorial debut films
1991 LGBT-related films
1990s American films
1990s English-language films
1990s female buddy films
1990s feminist films
1990s mystery comedy-drama films
American female buddy films
American LGBT-related films
American mystery comedy-drama films
Lesbian-related films
LGBT-related romantic comedy-drama films
Films about domestic violence
Films about families
Films based on American novels
Films set in the 1920s
Films set in the 1930s
Films set in the 1980s
Films set in Alabama
Films set in Georgia (U.S. state)
Films shot in Georgia (U.S. state)
Films directed by Jon Avnet
Films scored by Thomas Newman
Films with screenplays by Carol Sobieski
Universal Pictures films